Pace Giordano or Pax Jordanus (1586–1649) was a Roman Catholic prelate who served as Bishop of Trogir (1623–1649).

Biography
Pace Giordano was born in Valle de Conty, Italy in 1586.
On 20 March 1623, he was appointed during the papacy of Pope Gregory XV as Bishop of Trogir.
On 25 March 1623, he was consecrated bishop by Marco Antonio Gozzadini, Cardinal-Priest of Sant'Eusebio, with Joannes Mattaeus Caryophyllis, Titular Archbishop of Iconium, and Carlo Bovi, Bishop of Bagnoregio, serving as co-consecrators.
He served as Bishop of Trogir until his death 22 January 1649.

Episcopal succession

References

External links and additional sources
 (for Chronology of Bishops)
 (for Chronology of Bishops)

17th-century Roman Catholic bishops in Croatia
Bishops appointed by Pope Gregory XV
Giordano, Pace
1586 births
1649 deaths